Y with stroke (majuscule: Ɏ; minuscule: ɏ) is a letter of the Latin script, derived from Y with the addition of a stroke through the top of the letter.

Uses 
It is used in the Lubuagan Kalinga language of the Philippines. It is also used by Welsh medievalists to represent the schwa vowel sound.

Code positions

See also
 A Y with two strokes (¥) is the Latinized symbol of the Japanese yen and the Chinese yuan.

References 

Latin letters with diacritics